The 2016 season for the  cycling team began in January at the New Zealand Cycle Classic. ONE Pro is a British-registered UCI Professional Continental cycling team that participated in road bicycle racing events on the UCI Continental Circuits and when selected as a wildcard to UCI WorldTour events.

Team roster

Riders who joined the team for the 2016 season

Riders who left the team during or after the 2015 season

Season victories

Footnotes

References

External links
 

2016 road cycling season by team
2016 in British sport